Prokhorovka is an urban locality (a settlement) and the administrative center of Prokhorovsky District of Belgorod Oblast, Russia, along the Psyol River southeast of the city of Kursk. Population:

History
The first mention of the populated area in historical documents dates back to the second half of the 17th century. Polish nobleman Kiril G. Ilyinsky and his son Sava left during the Russian-Polish war of 1654–67 in Poland under the Belgorod, where they founded the suburb Elias. In 1860 Elias Sloboda was renamed in honor of the reigning Emperor Alexander II in the village of Alexandrov. In the 1880s west of the village passed a line of the Kursk-Kharkov-Azov railway. At the same time Prokhorovka station was built, named after the railway engineer V. I. Prokhorov responsible for its construction.
In the summer of 1943, Prokhorovka was the site of the Battle of Prokhorovka, a major armored confrontation during the Battle of Kursk of World War II. In July 2013, Vice Prime Minister Dmitry Rogozin offered to establish by 2015 a museum commemorating the battle. The display of armored vehicles will be permanent and the technologies shown there will bring up recollections of the events of World War II.

Transportation
Prokhorovka serves as a railway station on a major railway linking Moscow and the Ukrainian city of Kharkiv.

Gallery

References

Urban-type settlements in Belgorod Oblast
Populated places in Prokhorovsky District